Next Episode is the debut novel by French Canadian author Hubert Aquin, published in 1965.

Plot summary
The narrator, like Aquin himself, turns his adventures into a spy thriller to while away the time he is forced to spend in the psychiatric ward of a Montreal prison, where he is awaiting a trial for an unspecified revolutionary crime. The novel was translated by Penny Williams in 1967, and later again by Sheila Fischman.

Perspective
Narrated in first person by unnamed narrator

Significance
Served as a response to suggestions of cultural fatigue among French Canadian artists

Recognition
Prochain épisode (in its English translation by Sheila Fischman, Next Episode) was selected for the 2003 edition of  CBC Radio's Canada Reads competition, where it was championed by journalist Denise Bombardier. It was the winning title.

1965 Canadian novels
Canadian French-language novels
New Canadian Library
Novels set in Montreal
1965 debut novels